Anthonie Tonnon (born 1989) is a New Zealand songwriter, musician, public transport advocate and operator of Whanganui's historic Durie Hill Elevator.

Biography 
Tonnon grew up in Dunedin and studied music and history at the University of Otago.

The inspiration for some of Tonnon's works come from current affairs: "Water Underground" on irrigation on the Canterbury Plains; "Marion Bates Realty" on Auckland's gentrification; "Lockheed Bomber" about the Canberra air disaster; and his show Rail Land on car dependence.

In 2022 he won the Taite Music Prize for his album Leave Love Out of This.

In 2021 Tonnon took on the contract to operate the Durie Hill Elevator in Whanganui.

A minor planet 44527 Tonnon was named after Tonnon as a result of his Synthesized Universe, a show he developed in 2018 for the planetarium at the Otago Museum in Dunedin.

Discography

Studio albums

Singles

References

External links 
 Singer-songwriter Anthonie Tonnon becomes Whanganui underground elevator operator. Interview on RNZ, 28 June 2021
 Anthonie Tonnon website

New Zealand musicians
Misra Records artists
1989 births
Living people